Naima García Aguilar (born 24 June 1998) is a Spanish footballer who plays as a midfielder for Alavés.

Club career
García started her career at Zaragoza C.

References

External links
Profile at La Liga

1998 births
Living people
Women's association football midfielders
Spanish women's footballers
Footballers from Zaragoza
Zaragoza CFF players
Rayo Vallecano Femenino players
Deportivo Alavés Gloriosas players
Primera División (women) players
Segunda Federación (women) players
Primera Federación (women) players
Granada CF (women) players
21st-century Spanish women